Girolamo Lucenti (1627–1692) was an Italian sculptor of the Baroque period, active in Rome.

He initially trained with Alessandro Algardi, and at Algardi's death was one of the four giovani who shared the studio, but later also worked for Algardi's rival, Bernini. His unemotional angel at the Ponte Sant'Angelo is a reflection of an Algardian-restraint for an exuberant Bernini project. He also completed a tomb for Cardinal Girolamo Gastaldi (1685–1686) in the choir of Santa Maria dei Miracoli, and four bronze busts of popes in Santa Maria di Montesanto, its twin. Following a design provided by Bernini, Lucenti modelled a bronze statue of Philip IV of Spain (1692) under the portico of Santa Maria Maggiore.

Notes

Sources

Touring Club Italiano (TCI) Roma e dintorni 1965:182, 344, 465.

1627 births
1692 deaths
17th-century Italian sculptors
Italian male sculptors
Italian Baroque sculptors